Solomon Marcus (1 March 1925 – 17 March 2016) was a Romanian mathematician, member of the Mathematical Section of the Romanian Academy (full member from 2001) and emeritus professor of the University of Bucharest's Faculty of Mathematics.

His main research was in the fields of mathematical analysis, mathematical and computational linguistics and computer science. He also published numerous papers on various cultural topics: poetics, linguistics, semiotics, philosophy, and history of science and education.

Early life and education
He was born in Bacău, Romania, to Sima and Alter Marcus, a Jewish family of tailors. From an early age he had to live through dictatorships, war, infringements on free speech and free thinking as well as anti-Semitism. At the age of 16 or 17 he started tutoring younger pupils in order to help his family financially.

He graduated from Ferdinand I High School in 1944, and completed his studies at the University of Bucharest's Faculty of Science, Department of Mathematics, in 1949. He continued tutoring throughout college and later recounted in an interview that he had to endure hunger during those years and that till the age of 20 he only wore hand-me-downs from his older brothers.

Academic career
Marcus obtained his PhD in Mathematics in 1956, with a thesis on the Monotonic functions of two variables, written under the direction of Miron Nicolescu. He was appointed Lecturer in 1955, Associate Professor in 1964, and became a Professor in 1966 (Emeritus in 1991).

Marcus has contributed to the following areas:
Mathematical Analysis, Set Theory, Measure and Integration Theory, and Topology
Theoretical Computer Science
Linguistics
Poetics and Theory of Literature
Semiotics
Cultural Anthropology
History and Philosophy of Science
Education.

Publications by and on Marcus
Marcus published about 50 books, which have been translated into English, French, German, Italian, Spanish, Russian, Greek, Hungarian, Czech, Serbo-Croatian, and about 400 research articles in specialized journals in almost all European countries, in the United States, Canada, South America, Japan, India, and New Zealand among others; he is cited by more than a thousand authors, including mathematicians, computer scientists, linguists, literary researchers, semioticians, anthropologists and philosophers.

He is recognised as one of the initiators of mathematical linguistics and of mathematical poetics, and has been a member of the editorial board of tens of international scientific journals covering
all his domains of interest.

Marcus is featured in the 1999 book People and Ideas in Theoretical Computer Science. and the 2015 The Human Face of Computing .
A collection of his papers in English followed by some interviews and a brief autobiography was published in 2007 as Words and Languages Everywhere.

The book  "Meetings with Solomon Marcus" (Spandugino Publishing House, Bucharest, Romania, 2010, 1500 pages), edited by Lavinia Spandonide and Gheorghe Păun for Marcus' 85th birthday, includes recollections by several hundred people from a large variety of scientific and cultural fields, and from 25 countries. It also contains a longer autobiography.

Death

Honours
 National Order of Faithful Service in the rank of Grand Officer, 2011.
 Order of the Star of Romania (Romania's highest civil Order) in the rank of Commander, 2015.
  Romanian Royal Family: Knight of the Royal Decoration of Nihil Sine Deo.

Notes

References
 Alexandra Bellow, Cristian S. Calude.  Solomon Marcus (1925–2016), Notices of the American Mathematical Society 64,10 (2017), 1216.
 G. Păun, I. Petre, G. Rozenberg and A. Salomaa (eds.).  At the intersection of computer science with biology, chemistry and physics – In Memory of Solomon Marcus Theoretical computer science  701 (2017), 1–234. 
 Global Perspectives on Science and Spirituality (GPSS)
 Publication list on his web page, at the "Simion Stoilow" Institute of Mathematics of the Romanian Academy
 International Journal of Computers, Communications & Control, Vol.I (2006), No.1, pp. 73–79, "Grigore C. Moisil: A Life Becoming a Myth", by Solomon Marcus, Editor's note about the author (p. 79)
 Marcus' articles on semiotics at Potlatch

External links
 Solomon Marcus at the University of Bucharest

1925 births
2016 deaths
20th-century Romanian mathematicians
Romanian semioticians
Titular members of the Romanian Academy
Academic staff of the University of Bucharest
University of Bucharest alumni
Romanian Jews
People from Bacău
Mathematical analysts
Theoretical computer scientists
Computational linguistics researchers
Commanders of the Order of the Star of Romania
Recipients of the National Order of Faithful Service